The 1988 Bologna Open, also known as the  Internazionali di Tennis '88, was a men's tennis tournament played on outdoor clay courts in Bologna, Italy that was part of the 1988 Nabisco Grand Prix circuit. It was the fourth edition of the tournament and was played from 6 June until 12 June 1988. Fifth-seeded Alberto Mancini won the singles title.

Finals

Singles
 Alberto Mancini defeated  Emilio Sánchez 7–5, 7–6(7–4)
 It was Mancini's first singles title of his career.

Doubles
 Emilio Sánchez /  Javier Sánchez defeated  Rolf Hertzog /  Marc Walder 6–1, 7–6

References

External links
 ITF tournament edition details

Bologna Outdoor
Bologna
1988 in Italian tennis